Margaret B. Peeke (Peck; April 8, 1838 – November 2, 1908) was an American traveler, lecturer, and author of the long nineteenth centurys. In her early life, Peeke taught at a public school and her own private school. Later, she taught Hermetic philosophy in New York City, Chicago, Boston, Washington, D.C., and elsewhere (1893–98); visited Hermetic societies abroad (1898–99); and had an assembly of followers in Sandusky, Ohio. She served as Inspectress-General in the U.S. of the Martinist Order of France, and as treasurer of Light of France, Hermetic Society of France. She was a member of the Baháʼí Faith and of the Rose Cross Martinist Fraternity.

Early life and education
Margaret Bloodgood Peck was born at Mechanicville, New York, near Saratoga Springs, April 8, 1838. Her parents were Garry Marshall and Narcissa (Benedict) Peck.

Most of her childhood days were spent in New York City. She was twelve years old when her father died. She was educated in public and private schools. Her mother's brother, Erastus C. Benedict, Chancellor of University of the State of New York, charged himself with Margaret's education and became in many ways her counselor and guide.

Career
At the age of 16, she was already a contributor to magazines and periodicals. She taught in a public school in New York (1853–54), and her own private school in Irvington, New Jersey (1855-1859).

On May 17, 1860, she married Rev. George Hewson Peeke (1833–1915). In the later part of the decade, he served as pastor of the Dutch Reformed Church in Rock Island, Illinois.

For 15 years, she abandoned her literary life, and attended only to family and parish duties. When ill health forced her to rest, she resumed writing, submitting poems and stories to various periodicals.

In 1876, the family removed to Chicago, Illinois. Till 1882, Peeke was a part owner and served as associate editor of the Alliance, of Chicago. Her letters drew attention to her favorite summer-resort in the Cumberland Mountains, and a little pamphlet entitled "Pomona" was her reply to many requests for information. This was followed by a serial story, "The Madonna of the Mountains", and other serial sketches of that region.

Peeke's short biography of George Lansing Raymond appeared in an 1890 volume of The Magazine of Poetry. Her college novel, titled Antrobus and written while her son was in college in New England, was purchased by the Detroit Free Press and published as a serial in 1892, preparatory to a more permanent book form.  She was involved in a work connected with the pygmies of America and the origin of the race; it was issued under the title Born of Flame (Philadelphia, 1892). During this time in her life, she also taught Bible classes.

Later, Peeke became a leader of the Martinist movement in the U.S., giving her entire time to this work. Zenia, the Vestal, a story of Occult Life (1893; section edition, 1897), received a poor review in the British magazine, Light: A Journal of Psychical, Occult, and Mystical Research. "The Mission of Practical Occultism To-Day" and "The Psychic and the Spiritual" were published in The Arena, 1895. "Occult Truths Taught in the Mystic Land where 'Silence is Written on Everything'" and "True Magic. An Important Paper of a Practical Character on this Little Understood Subject" were published in 1901 in the Star of the Magi. Beginning in the same year, Peeke taught "Lessons in Practical Occultism. By Correspondence." 

By decree of the Supreme Council of the Martinist Order, the post of Sovereign Delegate General for the United States was abolished in 1902. It was replaced by a post of Inspectress-General of the Order, and this post was confided to Peeke, living at the time in Sandusky, Ohio. At the time, she was sole member of the Order in the U.S. possessing the Grade of Rosy-Cross of the Martinist Order. Numbers & Letters: Or, The Thirty-two Paths of Wisdom was published in 1908.

Death and legacy
Peeke died at the Peeke winter home in Pomona, Tennessee, November 2, 1908, survived by her husband and two of their six children, Hewsen L. and Benedict Peeke. Benedict committed suicide at a hotel in Cleveland, Ohio, September 21, 1910. In the following year, his widow, Dr. Pauline Barton-Peeke, published in booklet form an account of her mother-in-law's visit to Acca and subsequent investigations of the teachings of The Revelation of Baha'u'llah, titled My Visits to Abbas Effendi (Abdul-Baha) in 1899, by Mrs. Margaret B. Peeke.

Selected works
 Antrobus, 1892
 Born of Flame: A Rosicrucian Story, 1892
 Zenia, the Vestal, a story of Occult Life, 1893
 Soul development, or, Truth of all ages : taught by Margaret B. Peeke., 18-- (Text)
 Numbers & Letters: Or, The Thirty-two Paths of Wisdom, 1908 (Text)
 My Visit to Abbas-Effendi in 1899, 1911

Notes

References

Attribution

Bibliography

External links
 
 

1838 births
1908 deaths
19th-century American writers
19th-century American women writers
People from Saratoga County, New York
Writers from New York (state)
Martinism
Educators from New York (state)
Lecturers
American Bahá'ís
Rosicrucians
Wikipedia articles incorporating text from A Woman of the Century